Paul Bossi (born 22 July 1991) is a Luxembourgian football player.

External links

1991 births
Living people
Association football forwards
Association football midfielders
Luxembourgian footballers
Luxembourg youth international footballers
Luxembourg international footballers
CS Fola Esch players
FC Progrès Niederkorn players
Union Titus Pétange players
Luxembourg National Division players